Andrew Raspin (born 1969) is a British slalom canoeist who competed in the 1990s.

He won a bronze medal in the K-1 team event at the 1995 ICF Canoe Slalom World Championships in Nottingham. He also won a bronze medal in the K1 event at the 1998 European Championships in Roudnice nad Labem.

His older brother Ian Raspin is also a slalom canoeist.

References

ICF medalists for Olympic and World Championships - Part 2: rest of flatwater (now sprint) and remaining canoeing disciplines: 1936-2007.

British male canoeists
Living people
1969 births
Place of birth missing (living people)
Medalists at the ICF Canoe Slalom World Championships